Smarties is a chocolate confectionery made by Nestlé.

Smarties may also refer to:

 Smarties (tablet candy), a confectionery made by Smarties Candy Company (formerly Ce De Candy)
 Smarties, a variety of Troggles in the Number Munchers computer game

See also
 Smarty (disambiguation)